Borovsky or Borovskoy (masculine), Borovskaya (feminine), or Borovskoye (neuter) may refer to:

People 
Alexander Borovsky (1889–1968), Russian-American pianist 
 (born 1952), Curator of Contemporary Art at the Russian Museum, Saint Petersburg
Boris Borovsky (1939–2021), Russian tennis player and sports journalist
Eugene Znosko-Borovsky (1884–1954), Russian chess master
Karel Havlíček Borovský (1821–1856) Czech author and influential journalist
Piotr (Fokich) Borovsky (1863–1932), Russian military surgeon
Natasha Borovsky (born 1924), Russian/Polish-American poet and novelist
Sergei Borovsky (born 1956), association football player
Jonathan Borofsky (born 1942), American artist who lives and works in Maine
Michael Borofsky, documentary and music film director and producer based in New York
Nathan "Nate" D. Borofsky, vocalist, baritone guitarist, bass guitarist of Girlyman

Geography
Borovsky District, a district of Kaluga Oblast, Russia
Borovsky, Russia (Borovskoy, Borovskaya, Borovskoye), name of several inhabited localities in Russia
Borovskoy, Kazakhstan, a village and the administrative center of Mendykara District of Kostanay Province, Kazakhstan
Borovskoy, Sharyinsky District, Kostroma Oblast

See also
Borovský, Czech/Slovak form
Borowski/Borowsky, Polish form

Russian-language surnames
Slavic-language surnames